Barry Webster (born 1961) is a Canadian writer. Originally from Toronto, Ontario, he is currently based in Montreal, Quebec.

His short story collection The Sound of All Flesh won a ReLit Award in 2006, and was a shortlisted nominee for the Hugh MacLennan Award. His short stories have also been shortlisted for the National Magazine Award.

His 2012 novel The Lava in My Bones was a finalist for the Ferro-Grumley Award and the Lambda Literary Award. In 2013 he was awarded an Honour of Distinction by the Dayne Ogilvie Prize, an award presented by the Writers' Trust of Canada.

He was a featured speaker at the 2013 Saints and Sinners Literary Festival.

He has a B.A. in English literature from the University of Toronto, and an M.A. in creative writing from Concordia University. A classically trained pianist, he has two ARCTs from the Royal Conservatory of Music. He has also occasionally worked as an actor, including in a production of Sam Shepard's play Savage/Love and in a radio adaptation of his own short story "Enough".

Works
The Sound of All Flesh (2005)
The Lava in My Bones (2012)

References

External links
Barry Webster

1961 births
Canadian male novelists
Canadian male short story writers
Magic realism writers
Canadian gay writers
Writers from Montreal
Writers from Toronto
Anglophone Quebec people
University of Toronto alumni
Concordia University alumni
Living people
21st-century Canadian novelists
Canadian LGBT novelists
21st-century Canadian short story writers
21st-century Canadian male writers
21st-century Canadian LGBT people
Gay novelists